The Eighth Avenue Line is a public transit line in Brooklyn in New York City, running mostly on 8th Avenue and 39th Street between Sunset Park and Dyker Heights. Originally a streetcar line, it is now the B70 bus route, operated by MTA New York City Bus.

Route Description

Towards Dyker Heights 
It begins at 1st Avenue and 39th Street, similar to the B35 bus. It then goes via 39th Street until it turns left at 3rd Avenue and then turns right at 37th Street. Then it turns right again to 4th Avenue and left at 39th Street. It continues until it turns left at 8th Avenue. It goes on 8th Avenue the whole way. It then turns right to Bay Ridge Avenue and turns left on 7th Avenue. It goes the whole length until at 92nd Street, when it turns left and then turns right at 7th Avenue again. Then it goes in the bus loop at VA Hospital, where it ends.

Towards 1st Avenue & 39th Street 
It begins at the bus route's terminus, VA Hospital. It continues at 7th Avenue until at Fort Hamilton Parkway where it turns left. It then turns right onto Bay Ridge Parkway and then turns right back to 7th Avenue. It goes there until 8th Avenue, when it turns right and continues until 39th Street. It turns left onto that street and continues until it turns right at Fourth Avenue and turns left at 36th Street. It then turns left at Third Avenue and then turns right back into 39th Street. It then continues until it ends at 1st Avenue & 39th Street, the same terminus as the B35 bus.

History 
The Eighth Avenue streetcar line was built and opened on December 1, 1916. It was the last streetcar line built in Brooklyn. It ran on Eighth Avenue, from its terminus at Bay Ridge Avenue, through what is now Sunset Park. Streetcars continued to run until May 15, 1949, when it was converted to bus operation. 

In July 2010, due to budget cuts, the B37 bus was discontinued and the B70 bus was rerouted from 7th Avenue to 3rd Avenue in Bay Ridge. When the B37 bus was restored in June 29, 2014, the B70 bus was rerouted back from 3rd Avenue to 7th Avenue in Bay Ridge.

On December 1, 2022, the MTA released a draft redesign of the Brooklyn bus network. As part of the redesign, B70 service would be slightly extended to 3rd Avenue and 30th Street at its northern end to serve Industry City. Closely spaced stops would also be eliminated.

References 

Streetcar lines in Brooklyn
B070
B070